Aflalo is a surname. Notable people with the surname include:

Eli Aflalo (born 1952), Israeli politician
Raphael Aflalo (born 1996), Brazilian footballer
Valerie Aflalo (born 1976), Swedish model, beauty pageant winner, and fashion designer

See also
Arron Afflalo (born 1985), American basketball player